The following is a partial list of the "I" codes for Medical Subject Headings (MeSH), as defined by the United States National Library of Medicine (NLM).

This list continues the information at List of MeSH codes (I01). Codes following these are found at List of MeSH codes (I03). For other MeSH codes, see List of MeSH codes.

The source for this content is the set of 2006 MeSH Trees from the NLM.

– education

– curriculum
  – competency-based education
  – mainstreaming (education)
  – problem-based learning

– education, distance

– education, nonprofessional
  – education, special
  – education of mentally retarded
  – mainstreaming (education)
  – health education
  – health education, dental
  – health fairs
  – patient education
  – sex education
  – physical education and training
  – gymnastics
  – schools
  – schools, nursery
  – students
  – student dropouts
  – vocational education

– education, predental

– education, premedical

– education, professional
  – education, continuing
  – education, dental, continuing
  – education, medical, continuing
  – education, nursing, continuing
  – education, pharmacy, continuing
  – education, professional, retraining
  – education, dental
  – education, dental, continuing
  – education, dental, graduate
  – education, graduate
  – education, dental, graduate
  – education, medical, graduate
  – education, nursing, graduate
  – education, pharmacy, graduate
  – education, medical
  – education, medical, continuing
  – education, medical, graduate
  – education, medical, undergraduate
  – clinical clerkship
  – internship and residency
  – education, nursing
  – education, nursing, associate
  – education, nursing, baccalaureate
  – education, nursing, continuing
  – education, nursing, diploma programs
  – education, nursing, graduate
  – nursing education research
  – education, pharmacy
  – education, pharmacy, continuing
  – education, pharmacy, graduate
  – education, public health professional
  – education, veterinary
  – internship, nonmedical

– educational measurement
  – college admission test
  – professional competence
  – clinical competence
  – school admission criteria
  – self-evaluation programs

– faculty
  – faculty, dental
  – faculty, medical
  – faculty, nursing

– inservice training
  – staff development

– international educational exchange

– mentors

– needs assessment

– preceptorship

– schools
  – library schools
  – schools, health occupations
  – area health education centers
  – schools, dental
  – schools, medical
  – schools, nursing
  – schools, pharmacy
  – schools, public health
  – schools, veterinary
  – universities

– students
  – students, health occupations
  – students, dental
  – students, medical
  – students, nursing
  – students, pharmacy
  – students, premedical

– teaching
  – computer user training
  – models, educational
  – patient simulation
  – problem-based learning
  – programmed instruction
  – computer-assisted instruction
  – remedial teaching

The list continues at List of MeSH codes (I03).

I02